Kaarlo Anttinen (10 March 1915 – 21 June 2005) was a Finnish equestrian. He competed in two events at the 1956 Summer Olympics.

References

External links
 

1915 births
2005 deaths
Finnish male equestrians
Olympic equestrians of Finland
Equestrians at the 1956 Summer Olympics
People from Kuopio
Sportspeople from North Savo
20th-century Finnish people